Joseph Reed (August 27, 1741March 5, 1785) was a Founding Father of the United States and a lawyer, military officer, and statesman of the American Revolutionary Era who lived the majority of his life in Pennsylvania. He served as a delegate to the Continental Congress and, while in Congress, signed the Articles of Confederation. He also served as President of Pennsylvania's Supreme Executive Council, during the American Revolutionary War, a position analogous to the modern office of Governor.

Early life
Reed was born in Trenton in the Province of New Jersey in 1741, the son of Andrew Reed, a shopkeeper and merchant, and Theodosia Bowes. His grandfather, Joseph Reed (1650–1727), was born in Carrickfergus, County Antrim in Ulster and settled in West Jersey. His brother, Bowes Reed (1740–1794), would serve as a colonel in the Revolutionary War and as Secretary of State of New Jersey. The family moved to Philadelphia shortly after Reed's birth and, as a boy, Reed was enrolled at Philadelphia Academy (later to be known as the University of Pennsylvania). He received his bachelor's degree from the College of New Jersey (later known as Princeton University) in 1757 and, soon after, began his professional education under Richard Stockton. In the summer of 1763, Reed sailed for England, where, for two years, he continued his studies in law at Middle Temple in London. Shortly after his studies ended in 1768, Reed was elected to the American Philosophical Society as a member.

During the course of his studies, Reed became romantically attached to Esther de Berdt, the daughter of the agent for the Province of Massachusetts Bay, Dennis de Berdt. Though very fond of Reed, de Berdt was aware of Reed's intention to return to Philadelphia and initially refused consent for Esther to marry him. Reed returned to the Colonies with only a tenuous engagement to Esther, and with an understanding that he would return to settle permanently in Great Britain shortly after. Following the death of his father, Reed finally returned to London to find that Esther's father had died during Reed's return trip to Britain. Reed and Esther married in May 1770 at Saint Luke's, Cripplegate, near the City of London. Finding the de Berdt family in financial difficulties, Reed remained in London long enough to help settle his wife's family's affairs. Together with the widowed Mrs. de Berdt, Esther and Reed sailed for North America in October 1770.

The Reeds would have five children: Joseph, who would become a prominent lawyer; Denis de Berdt; George Washington, who would become a Navy commander; Esther; and Martha.

Military career
At the beginning of the Revolutionary War, Reed ran a successful Philadelphia law practice, from which he resigned at the request of George Washington. In 1775, Reed held the rank of colonel and he subsequently served in the capacity of secretary and aide-de-camp to Washington.

On October 20, 1775, Reed wrote a famous letter to Colonel John Glover of the "Marblehead Men" Regiment of seamen in the Continental Army, setting the design of the First Navy Flag, the Evergreen Tree of Liberty flag. Colonel Glover was the owner of the Hannah vessel (named for his wife) and was the action officer, along with Stephen Moylan, for commissioning the other First Navy ships (Franklin, Hancock, Harrison, Lee, Lynch, Warren, and Washington), often called the "Washington Cruisers". Reed wrote: "What do you think of a Flag with a white Ground, a tree in the middle, the motto: "Appeal to Heaven"."

In 1775, Reed commenced service as Adjutant-General of the Continental Army. In this service he became one of General Washington's closest confidants; Washington wrote letters to him frequently and rarely traveled or made any substantial military decision without first consulting Reed. In December 1776, anxious to know the location of General Charles Lee's forces following the Continental Army's chaotic retreat from Manhattan, Washington opened a letter from Lee to Reed which indicated that they were both having serious doubts about Washington's decision-making and abilities. This was extremely disconcerting to Washington, as Reed was one of his most trusted officers. Reed continued to serve in the army without pay until the close of the war; although, with fewer than three years in the Continental Army, Reed is not listed as a propositus of the Society of the Cincinnati. Though he took part in many military engagements in the northern and eastern theaters of the war, Reed was never wounded. In 1777, Reed was offered the positions of brigadier general and Chief Justice of the Supreme Court of Pennsylvania, both of which he declined. He was elected to Congress in 1778, whilst also serving as President (Governor) in Pennsylvania.

Reed has been recognized for his integrity, and when offered a bribe of £10,000, as well as the most valuable office in the colonies, to promote the cause of colonial reconciliation with the British crown, Reed's reply was, "I am not worth purchasing; but, such as I am, the King of Great Britain is not rich enough to do it." As a delegate to the Continental Congress, Reed accused Benedict Arnold of military malpractice whilst the latter was in command at Philadelphia. Arnold had used military personnel and wagons to move cargoes for his private business. The subsequent court martial largely exonerated Arnold and received strong opposition from other members of Congress.

Political career
In 1778, Reed was one of the five delegates from Pennsylvania to sign the Articles of Confederation. On December 1, 1778, he was elected President of the Supreme Executive Council of Pennsylvania, a position analogous to the modern office of governor. Reed received 61 of the 63 votes and assumed office immediately. George Bryan, acting president since the death of Thomas Wharton on May 23, 1778, received only one vote for president, but was re-elected to the vice-presidency with an overwhelming majority similar to Reed's final tally. Reed was re-elected to the presidency twice – on November 11, 1779, and November 14, 1780 – each time defeating William Moore, with a final count of 59 to 1 at the second election. Reed's third and final term came to a close on November 15, 1781, when he was eventually succeeded by Moore.

During Reed's tenure as president, in addition to prosecuting Benedict Arnold, Reed oversaw the abolition of slavery in Pennsylvania and the awarding of Revolutionary soldiers with lifelong "half-pay". Pennsylvania passed a law for the gradual abolition of slavery in 1780.

Reed's antipathy to Pennsylvania's Loyalist residents has been well attested by historic sources. Whilst in Congress, he advocated for the seizure of Loyalist properties and treason charges for those aligned with Great Britain (Reed and his family then lived in a confiscated Loyalist home). In an overall sense, Congress regarded the Loyalist citizens in a more tolerant manner. As the President of Pennsylvania, Reed oversaw numerous trials of suspected Loyalists. After James Wilson defended 23 people accused of treason, a mob, stirred up by Reed's speeches and their own liquor consumption, attacked Wilson in what was to be later known as the "Battle of Fort Wilson"; only the arrival of cavalry saved Wilson and his friends. Following the cavalry's handling of the conflict, Reed pardoned and released the remaining rioters.

Reed's term as President of Pennsylvania corresponded with the transformation of America's wartime fortunes from desolation, at Valley Forge from December 1777 to May 1778, into victory, at Yorktown on October 19, 1781. Working with James Madison in the Continental Congress, Reed passed a bill that resulted in the surrounding of Charles Cornwallis' army. Once the bill was validated, General Anthony Wayne gathered the resources that were necessary for the Pennsylvania Line to march to Yorktown to engage in the historic siege.

On the other hand, Pennsylvania went bankrupt in 1780 due to Constitutionalist policies which mandated state-controlled markets and self-imposed embargoes. Ultimately the state called on Robert Morris to restore the economy. He did so by opening the ports to trade, and allowing the market to set the value of goods and the currency. Morris and his allies supplied the majority of war materials to the troops when the state failed to act.

Death
In 1784, Reed visited England with the hope of improving his health but was not successful. He returned to Pennsylvania and died in Philadelphia on March 5, 1785, at the age of 43. Reed was buried in Philadelphia's Laurel Hill Cemetery in 1868.

References

Further reading
 W. B. Reed, Life and correspondence of Joseph Reed, military secretary of Washington, at Cambridge; Adjutant-General of the Continental Army, Volume 1.By his Grandson William Bradford Reed. Publisher: Lindsay and Blakiston Philadelphia, 1847 
 The Life and Correspondence of Joseph Reed Volume II 
 George Bancroft, Joseph Reed, An Historical Essay (New York, 1867), in which Reed is presented in an unfavorable light. The New International Encyclopedia

External links
 

 
 Biographic sketch of Esther de Berdt at White House website for children
 Biography and portrait at the University of Pennsylvania
  Reed, Joseph page 451-53 Dictionary of American biography. Volume XV. Edited by Dumas Malone. Publisher C. Scribner's Sons New York, 1943

1741 births
1785 deaths
Politicians from Trenton, New Jersey
American people of Scotch-Irish descent
Signers of the Articles of Confederation
Continental Congressmen from Pennsylvania
18th-century American politicians
Governors of Pennsylvania
Politicians from Philadelphia
People of colonial Pennsylvania
Adjutants general of the United States Army
Continental Army staff officers
Pennsylvania state court judges
Pennsylvania lawyers
Justices of the Supreme Court of Pennsylvania
American abolitionists
American slave owners
Flag designers
Princeton University alumni
University of Pennsylvania people
Aides-de-camp of George Washington
People of colonial New Jersey
Reed family (Pennsylvania and New Jersey)
Burials at Laurel Hill Cemetery (Philadelphia)
Founding Fathers of the United States